Juan Gil Zambrano (?-?) was an officer of the Spanish army, he served during the Viceroyalty of Peru as Lieutenant Governor of Buenos Aires.

Biography
Zambrano arrived at the port of Buenos Aires towards the end of 1609 in the ship "Espiritu Santo", accompanying Diego Martínez Negron, the successor of Hernandarias, in the governorship of the Río de la Plata. In the city marries to María Martinez, possibly related to Diego Martínez Negron. 

Juan Gil Zambrano was appointed Lieutenant Governor and Justiciary by the same Martínez Negron in 1609, and was replaced by Manuel de Frias on June 17, 1611.

References

External links
Archive.org

16th-century Spanish people
17th-century Spanish people
Spanish military personnel
Spanish colonial governors and administrators